Eunjong "JJu" Byeon is a retired StarCraft pro gamer and poker player from South Korea.

Byun started his career at the STX Soul Team in 2002.  He moved to the Samsung Khan Team in May 2005, where he acted as team leader.  He and his team Khan won the championship for the Starcraft Pro-league 06-07 Season.

Currently retired, he is working his skill as a poker player.

Accomplishments
2003 MBC TeamLeague Rookie Award
2004 Hangame Ongamenet Starleague 4th place
2004 Proleague 2nd Place
2005 Proleague 2nd Place
2005 Korea E-Sports Association League 1st Place (MVP)
2006 Proleague 1st Place
2006 Ongamenet StarLeague 4th Place
2006 MBC Starleague 3rd Place
2006 Ranked 3rd Place for All-time Progamer Ranking
2005~2007 Team Leader for Samsung Khan Progame Team

References

External links
Jju's fan cafe (Korean)

1983 births
StarCraft players
Living people
South Korean esports players